Boruto (ボルト) means "bolt" or "volt" in Japanese.

Boruto may also refer to:

 Boruto: Naruto the Movie, an animated film produced by Pierrot in 2015
 Boruto: Naruto Next Generations, a manga series written by Ukyo Kodachi and Masashi Kishimoto, and illustrated by Mikio Ikemoto since 2016, with an anime adaptation airing since 2017
 Boruto Uzumaki, the main protagonist of the film, manga and anime series